The Coptercam is a custom-built, remotely piloted aircraft used for aerial photography, filming and live broadcasting of video.

As a multi-rotor electric unmanned aerial vehicle, it is propelled using eight electric brush-less DC motors.

History 
An original company, Coptercam was founded in 2010 in Austria and used MikroKopter technology. 

Coptercam Pty. Ltd., developed the Coptercam as a purpose built aerial camera system.  The Australian company began in 2011 specifically to create a turnkey UAV service for providing aerial photography and filming.  In April 2012, the Civil Aviation Safety Authority approved the Coptercam as an Unmanned Aerial System and issued Coptercam Pvt. Ltd. with a UAS Operator Certificate.

Essential data and performance 
 Weight (BEW):		1600g (3.5 lb) without batteries 
 Battery weight:	        715 - 1430g (1.6 - 3.2 lb) 
 Max Payload:		2000g (4.4 lb) (inclusive of camera mount) 
 MTOW:		        5030g (11.1 lb)
 Motors:	                8 x brush-less DC, 350W (0.5 hp) maximum power, 2200g (4.9 lb) max thrust, 125g (0.3 lb) weight
 Propellers:		12” (30.5 cm)
 Battery:		14.8V. 6600 mAh or 2 x 3300 mAh  or 2 x 5000 mAh
 Arm length:		355mm – 435mm (14 - 17.1 in.)
 Total diameter:	        1100mm. (43.3 in.)
 Radio control:		2.4 GHz FHSS with telemetry
 Video down-link:	        5.8 GHz COFDM
 PC Telemetry link:	900Mhz FHSS
 Endurance:	        12 minutes with HD camera and 10% reserve.

Variants
The aircraft comes in 2 variants, the Coptercam 8 AD and the Coptercam 8 CS.  The major difference between the two variants is the air-frame and camera gimbal system.

 The Coptercam 8 AD has a 2 axis stabilised gimbal system which allows for roll and pitch control and stabilization.
 The Coptercam 8 CS has a 3 axis stabilised gimbal system which allows 360 degree pan in addition to roll and pitch stabilization.  Due to the extra payload weight, its maximum flight time is reduced to 8 minutes.

Operational history 

 In April 2012, the Coptercam was first employed in Western Australia to take photographs of real estate properties for sale.
 In June 2012, Coptercam to survey damage caused by a tornado in Western Australia.
 On 21 December 2012, the Coptercam made headlines at the Melbourne Cricket Ground as the FoxKopter.  The Coptercam became the first Unmanned Aerial Vehicle (UAV) or Remotely Piloted Aircraft (RPA) to provide full HD live video broadcast to a television network, and be approved by any civil aviation authority.  The Coptercam was extensively used at the Cricket during the T20 Big Bash League 02.
 In 2013, Fox Sports deployed the Coptercam at the National Rugby League, Rip Curl Pro Bells Beach, and the A-League finals. Unlike other cameras used at sporting events, the Coptercam is able move in any direction, and fly from ground level to 400 ft.

On TV 
Footage captured on a Coptercam:
 Freedom Furniture
 Finbar - Spring View Towers
 The University of Western Australia
 The Bigger Picture
 Rip Curl Pro - Bells Beach
 Fox Sports NRL

See also 
 Skycam
 Steadicam
 Spidercam

References

External links 
 www.coptercam.com.au
 www.foxsports.com.au
 www.coptercam.info

Unmanned aerial vehicles of Australia
Multirotor helicopters